Les Herbiers is a commune in the Vendée department in the Pays de la Loire region, western France.

Population

Sport
Les Herbiers is host to the Chrono des Nations, an annual one-day individual time trial bicycle race, held in October. Les Herbiers VF is based in the commune.

Twin towns
Les Herbiers is twinned with:
  Newtown, United Kingdom

Notable people
 
 
Guy Chevalier (born 1938), French clergyman and bishop

See also
Communes of the Vendée department

References

Communes of Vendée
Poitou